The National Union was a short-lived South African political party founded in 1960 by Japie Basson after he was expelled from the ruling National Party. It was meant to provide a political home for Nationalists who had become disillusioned with J. G. Strydom and Hendrik Verwoerd's increasingly hard-line apartheid policies. Basson recruited former Chief Justice of South Africa Henry Allan Fagan to stand as the party's candidate for President in the 1961 general election, in which the party won 6.26% of the vote but only one parliamentary seat. The party soon fizzled out and was absorbed into the United Party.

References 

Liberal parties in South Africa
Conservative parties in South Africa
Protestant political parties
Defunct political parties in South Africa
Apartheid in South Africa
1960 establishments in South Africa
Political parties established in 1960